Balkanov Peak is the ice-covered twin peak rising to 646 and 648 m in Brugmann Mountains on Liège Island in the Palmer Archipelago, Antarctica.  It surmounts Coria Cove to the south and Shterna Glacier to the north.

The feature is named after Ivan Balkanov, boatman at St. Kliment Ohridski base in 2002/03 and subsequent seasons.

Location
British mapping in 1978.

Maps
 British Antarctic Territory.  Scale 1:200000 topographic map.  DOS 610 Series, Sheet W 64 60.  Directorate of Overseas Surveys, UK, 1978.
 Antarctic Digital Database (ADD). Scale 1:250000 topographic map of Antarctica. Scientific Committee on Antarctic Research (SCAR). Since 1993, regularly upgraded and updated.

Notes

References
 Bulgarian Antarctic Gazetteer. Antarctic Place-names Commission. (details in Bulgarian, basic data in English)
 Balkanov Peak. SCAR Composite Antarctic Gazetteer.

External links
 Balkanov Peak. Copernix satellite image

Mountains of the Palmer Archipelago
Bulgaria and the Antarctic
Liège Island